Sharette Y. García (born 2 July 1969) is a Belizean middle-distance runner. She competed in the women's 800 metres at the 1996 Summer Olympics.

References

External links
 

1969 births
Living people
Athletes (track and field) at the 1996 Summer Olympics
Belizean female middle-distance runners
Olympic athletes of Belize
Place of birth missing (living people)